The Enforcers are a team of supervillains appearing in American comic books published by Marvel Comics, usually as adversaries of the superheroes Spider-Man and Daredevil. The original Enforcers consisted of Montana (Jackson Brice), the Ox (Raymond Bloch), and Fancy Dan (Daniel Brito).

Publication history
Created by writer-editor Stan Lee and artist and co-plotter Steve Ditko, the team's first appearance was in The Amazing Spider-Man #10 (March 1964).

The Enforcers appear often in the early issues of The Amazing Spider-Man, debuting in #10, and returning in #14 and 18–19, in the latter two issues teaming with the supervillain the Sandman. The team would go on to appear in Daredevil #356–357 and Dazzler #7–8, and fight Spider-Man again in Marvel Team-Up #39–40 and 138, Peter Parker, the Spectacular Spider-Man #19–20, Spider-Man #94–95, Spider-Man (vol. 2) #28, and elsewhere.

Fictional team biography
The Enforcers are a group of hired hitmen and extortionists, each with an expertise in a different and unique area of combat, whose goal it is to aid various employers in the takeover of New York City's criminal gangs. In their first appearance, the Enforcers aided the Big Man (Frederick Foswell) in his attempt to gain control of New York City's criminal gangs. They clashed with the superhero Spider-Man for the first time, and are defeated by him.

They were subsequently employed by paranoid industrialist Norman Osborn, hired them to shut down Malone's Flophouse in a bid to gain the land. However, the then-amnesiac Malone resident Namor the Sub-Mariner thwarted them, later destroying Osborn's construction equipment. They next aided the Green Goblin in his first unsuccessful attempt to eliminate Spider-Man, but were again defeated and jailed. Soon after that, they joined forces with the Sandman to subdue the Human Torch at a point where it was believed Spider-Man had become a coward, but are defeated by the combined might of Spider-Man and the Human Torch.

The Enforcers clash repeatedly with Spider-Man and occasionally other heroes such as Daredevil. Foswell is eventually unmasked, but later reforms and is killed. Afterward, the Ox also appears to have been killed,

Montana and Fancy Dan team with a new Big Man, as well as with the Sandman and a new Crime Master, Nick Lewis, Jr. son of the original. During a battle in which the team is defeated by Spider-Man, the Human Torch, and the Sons of the Tiger, Crime Master shoots the new Big Man, learning belatedly that this "Big Man" was, in fact, a woman — Janice Foswell, daughter of the original and the younger Lewis' romantic interest.

The Enforcers were hired by Lightmaster, who introduced a new Ox, Raymond Bloch's twin brother Ronald Bloch, to the team. The Enforcers are once again defeated by Spider-Man. They later battle the mutant superheroine the Dazzler.

The Enforcers return with new members "Snake" Marston, a master contortionist, and "Hammer" Harrison, a boxer who wears steel hammers over his hands. The Enforcers come under the employ of the Kingpin, but were defeated by Spider-Man and the then-reformed Sandman. This lineup appears only once more to fight Daredevil.

The original Ox (Raymond Bloch) returns, revived by the Kingpin. It is unclear whether it is Raymond or Ronald Bloch who appears with Montana and Fancy Dan in subsequent battles with Spider-Man and the She-Hulk.

During the events known as the superhero Civil War, either Raymond or Ronald Bloch and "Snake" Marston are recruited into the Thunderbolts, a team of reformed villains.

Later, they came back together to work for Mister Fear, which pitted them directly against Daredevil. After Mister Fear's arrest, the Enforcers are taken in to work for the Hood's crime organization.

Following the events of the storyline "Spider-Man: Brand New Day", the Enforcers are patrons at the Bar with No Name. They take bets with a person calling himself "the Bookie", over whether Spider-Man will show up to battle "Basher", an unknown villain who claimed to have fought Spider-Man. Spider-Man shows up, but is revealed to be Screwball in disguise when the real one shows up at the scene of the fight. The Enforcers decide to get revenge on the Bookie, capturing him. The Bookie's father calls Spider-Man for assistance and he agrees to help. Spider-Man defeats Fancy Dan and Montana and saves the Ox from being flattened by a falling roller coaster. Grateful for the save, the Ox agrees to come along quietly.

During the "Origin of the Species"' storyline, Spider-Man goes against the villains after Menace's infant was stolen from him by the Chameleon. The Enforcers were not actually part of this group, where they quoted "we're the Enforcers, not the Kidnappers". They got caught in the crossfire anyway when the Sandman tries to recruit them to team up with him again.

Montana then started working for the Kingpin. During a fight which resulted in the Kingpin's office crumbling, the Hobgoblin lets him fall to his death in order to take his place as Fisk's right-hand man.

The Enforcers (Fancy Dan, the Ox, "Snake" Marston and "Hammer" Harrison) are reassembled by the fourth Crime Master, who convinces them and the Black Cat to assist him with breaking Hammerhead and Tombstone out of Ryker's Island. The attempted breakout is prevented by Spider-Man and the Wraith and the Crime Master is revealed to be an impostor who Mister Negative had instructed to assassinate Hammerhead and Tombstone.

During the "Hunted" storyline, "Snake" Marston is among the animal-themed characters that were captured by the Taskmaster and the Black Ant for Kraven the Hunter's Great Hunt, which is sponsored by Arcade's company, Arcade Industries. He was seen at a gathering held by the Vulture.

During the "Devil's Reign" storyline, the Enforcers members Fancy Dan, Ox, Montana, Snake Marston, and Hammer Harrison were shown as inmates of the Myrmidon. When 8-Ball offered to sit with them, they turn him down.

Membership

Original members
The group originally consisted of:

 Fancy Dan - A diminutive martial artist. Daniel Brito was born in Brooklyn, New York. He has great proficiency with judo, karate and fancy footwork.
 The Ox I - Raymond Bloch is a brutish strongman and the twin brother of Ronald Bloch.
 Montana - Jackson W. Brice is an expert lasso-wielder.

Later members
These members were later additions to the group. They consisted of:

 The Ox II - Ronald Bloch is a brutish strongman and the twin brother of Raymond Bloch. He became the second Ox after the apparent death of the original Ox. When his brother Raymond came back from the dead and rejoined the group, Ronald left it.
 "Snake" Marston - Sylvester "Snake" Marston is an expert contortionist.
 "Hammer" Harrison - Willard "Hammer" Harrison is an expert boxer who wore two diamond-hard steel hammers on his hands.

Other versions

Earth X
In the Earth X reality, the Enforces consisted of Fancy Dan, the Ox and Montana, with the Vulture as a later addition. They would be hired by President Norman Osborn to act as his bodyguards. However, the Enforcers would fail in this task when the Skull arrived in New York to take over the United States. Like all who encounter the Skull, the Enforcers would be put under his control and Norman Osborn would be murdered. The Enforcers' fate following the Skull's death remain unrevealed.

Marvel Noir
In Spider-Man Noir, the Enforcers are the muscle working for mob boss Norman Osborn, also known as the Goblin. Like the rest of the Goblin's goons (Kraven and Adrian Toomes), they are former carnies.

MC2
Fancy Dan makes a cameo appearance in an issue of The Amazing Spider-Girl as the owner of a company called Brito Imports and the leader of the Brooklyn gangs.

The Enforcers appear when Mayday/Spider-Girl ended up within the mind of her father, observing his first encounter with the original Green Goblin.

Ultimate Marvel
In the alternate universe Ultimate Marvel continuity, the Enforcers were re-imagined as hit men for the Kingpin and pitted against Spider-Man. The following changes took place:

 Frederick Foswell was called Mr. Big and was not associated with the Daily Bugle - but videotapes of his untimely murder by the Kingpin were sent to Ben Urich and used for a Daily Bugle exclusive. 
 "Fancy Dan" was re-imagined as a young gunslinger and was called Dan Crenshaw.
 "The Ox" was re-imagined as a Black Dominican called Bruno Sanchez.
 "Montana" had the civil name Montana Bale and used a whip instead of a lasso (although he often used it to strangle Spider-Man like a lasso).

After losing three times to Spider-Man, along with unofficial member Electro, the Enforcers supposedly disbanded.

Much later, they came back together to work for Hammerhead. This pitted them directly against their former employer.

In other media

Television
 The Enforcers appear in the Spider-Man episode "Blueprint For Crime", consisting of Ox and Montana, the latter of whom is known as "Cowboy".
 The Enforcers appear in The Spectacular Spider-Man, with Fancy Dan voiced by Phil LaMarr, the Ox voiced by Clancy Brown and later by Danny Trejo, and Montana voiced by Jeff Bennett. This version of the group utilize modern weaponry, suits, and equipment. Montana serves as the leader and strategist, the Ox as the strongman, and Fancy Dan as a martial artist. They debut in the series' pilot, "Survival of the Fittest", having been hired by the crime boss Tombstone via his second Hammerhead to kill Spider-Man. However, Fancy Dan and the Ox are captured while Montana successfully escapes. In the episode "Market Forces", Montana returns as the series' version of the Shocker, only to be defeated and captured as well. In the episode "Group Therapy", the Enforcers are broken out of prison, though Montana joins the Sinister Six to kill Spider-Man alongside five of his previous enemies, only to be defeated once more. Montana rejoins the Enforcers in the episode "Probable Cause", after Fancy Dan and the Ox receive powered suits from the Tinkerer so they can better succeed in a mission for Tombstone. Dubbing themselves the New Enforcers, they nearly succeed in both the mission and defeating Spider-Man, but are secretly sabotaged by Hammerhead, who seeks to usurp Tombstone; leading to their arrest. As of the episode "Opening Night", the Enforcers are incarcerated at the Vault.
 The Enforcers appear in the Ultimate Spider-Man episode "Nightmare on Christmas", with Fancy Dan voiced by Steven Weber, the Ox voiced by Mark Hamill, and Montana voiced by Troy Baker.

Video games
The Enforcers appear in Marvel Heroes. They kidnap Speedball and almost kill him. However, they are caught in the act by Jean DeWolff, who kills them all.

Footnotes

References
 Enforcers at Marvel.com
 Marvel Directory: Enforcers
 Grand Comics Database

Comics characters introduced in 1964
Characters created by Stan Lee
Characters created by Steve Ditko
Marvel Comics supervillain teams
Spider-Man characters